The Horseferry Road drill hall was a military installation at 95 Horseferry Road, London.

History
The drill hall was designed as the drill hall for G (London Scottish) Company 1st Battalion 51st Highland Volunteers and completed in 1985. It incorporates parts of the structure, including the wrought iron roof, the double-level iron galleries and the war memorials, which were relocated from the company's previous drill hall at 59 Buckingham Gate.

Prior to their move to 76D Rochester Row, it was the home of A (London Scottish) Company of the London Regiment. It is a Grade II listed building. The London Scottish Regiment Museum holds a collection of regimental memorabilia which it displays on the galleries.

References

Drill halls in London
Buildings and structures in the City of Westminster